This table shows an overview of the beschermd erfgoed in the Walloon town Awans. This list is part of Belgium's protected heritage sites.

|}

See also 
 List of protected heritage sites in Liège (province)

References
 Belgian heritage register: Direction générale opérationnelle - Aménagement du territoire, Logement, Patrimoine et Energie (DG4)

Awans
Awans